Georges Duby (7 October 1919 – 3 December 1996) was a French historian who specialised in the social and economic history of the Middle Ages. He ranks among the most influential medieval historians of the twentieth century and was one of France's most prominent public intellectuals from the 1970s to his death.

Born to a family of Provençal craftsmen living in Paris, Duby was initially educated in the field of historical geography before he moved into history. He earned an undergraduate degree at Lyon in 1942 and completed his graduate thesis at the Sorbonne under Charles-Edmond Perrin in 1952. He taught first at Besançon and then at the University of Aix-en-Provence before he was appointed in 1970 to the Chair of the History of Medieval Society in the Collège de France. He remained attached to the Collège until his retirement in 1991. He was elected to the Académie française in 1987.

Impact of the Mâconnais book

Although Duby authored dozens of books, articles and reviews during his prolific career—for academic as well as popular audiences—his reputation and legacy as a scholar will always be attached to his first monograph, a published version of his 1952 doctoral thesis entitled La société aux XIe et XIIe siècles dans la région mâconnaise (Society in the 11th and 12th centuries in the Mâconnais region). La société exerted a profound influence on medieval scholarship in the second half of the twentieth century, placing the study of medieval feudal society on an entirely new footing. Working from the extensive documentary sources surviving from the Burgundian monastery of Cluny, as well as the dioceses of Mâcon and Dijon, Duby excavated the complex social and economic relationships among the individuals and institutions of the Mâconnais region, charting a profound shift in the social structures of medieval society around the year 1000.

Duby argued that in early eleventh century, governing institutions—particularly comital courts established under the Carolingian monarchy—that had represented public justice and order in Burgundy during the ninth and tenth centuries receded and gave way to a new feudal order wherein independent aristocratic knights wielded power over peasant communities through strong-arm tactics and threats of violence. The emergence of this new, decentralized society of dynastic lords could then explain such later eleventh-century phenomena as the Peace of God, the Gregorian reform movement and the Crusades.

Following upon this, Duby formulated a famous theory about the Crusades: that the tremendous response to the idea of Holy War against the Muslims can be traced to the desire of iuvenes, knights, mostly young and with little prospect of becoming lords, to make their fortunes by venturing abroad and seeking fame in the Levant. While Duby's theory had long-lasting influence, later scholars such as Jonathan Riley-Smith argued against it, arguing that there was no large-scale shortage of land in Western Europe at the time, that knights actually lost money going on crusade, and that lay religious sentiment was their primary motivation. Not all modern scholars follow Riley-Smith in this regard.

Duby's intensive and rigorous examination of a local society based on archival sources and a broad understanding of the social, environmental and economic bases of daily life became a standard model for medieval historical research in France for decades after the appearance of La société. Throughout the 1970s and 80's, French doctoral students investigated their own corners of medieval France, Italy and Spain in a similar way, hoping to compare and contrast their own results with those of Duby's Mâconnais and its thesis about the transformation of European society at the end of the first millennium.

Although he was never formally a student in the circle of scholars around Marc Bloch and Lucien Febvre that came to be known as the Annales School, Duby was in many ways the most visible exponent of the Annaliste tradition, emphasizing the need to place people and their daily lives at the center of historical inquiry.

Histoire des mentalités 

Duby was also a pioneer in what he and other Annaliste historians in the 1970s and 80's came to call the "history of mentalities", or the study of not just what people did, but their value systems and how they imagined their world. In books like The Three Orders: Feudal Society Imagined and The Age of Cathedrals, Duby showed how ideals and social reality existed in dynamic relationship to one another. His distilled biographical essay on William Marshal set the knight's career in the context of feudal loyalties, honour and the chivalric frame of mind.

Duby's interest in the idea of historical "mentalities" extended to thinking about the position of contemporary society vis-a-vis its past. In Le Dimanche de Bouvines (1973) on the pivotal 1214 battle of Bouvines, Duby chose not to analyze the battle itself, but the ways it had been represented and remembered over time and the role its memory had played in the formation of French ideas about its medieval past. The book remains a classic of Annales-style historiography, eschewing the "great man" and event-oriented theories of political history in favor of asking questions about the evolution of historical perceptions and ideas over the long term, the longue durée. Duby also wrote frequently in newspapers and popular journals and was a regular guest on radio and television programs promoting historical awareness and support for the arts and social sciences in France. He served as the first director of Société d'édition de programmes de télévision (aka La Sept), a French broadcast network dedicated to educational programming.

His last book, L'histoire continue (History Continues) (1991; Engl. trans. 1994), is an intellectual autobiography. In it, Duby stresses the importance of the historian as a public figure who can make the past relevant and exciting to those in the present. 'Make no mistake: the first function of historical literature had always been to entertain.'

Honours and awards

Honours
 Commandeur of the Legion of Honour.
 Grand officier of the National Order of Merit.
 Commandeur of the Ordre des Palmes Académiques.
 Commandeur of the Ordre des Arts et des Lettres.
 Chevalier of the Order of Agricultural Merit.
 Officier of the Order of Orange-Nassau.

Awards
 Grand prix Gobert (1977)
 Prix des Ambassadeurs (France, 1973)
 Lauréat du concours général (France)

Acknowledgement
 Member of the Académie Française 
 Member of the Académie des Inscriptions et Belles-Lettres 
 Member of the British Academy 
 Member of the Medieval Academy of America 
 Member of the Royal Academy of Science, Letters and Fine Arts of Belgium 
 Member of the Accademia dei Lincei 
 Member of the Academia Europaea 
 Member of the Hungarian Academy of Sciences 
 Member of the Royal Spanish Academy 
 Member of the Real Academia de Buenas Letras de Barcelona
 Member of the American Philosophical Society 
 Member of the Royal Historical Society

Honorary degrees
 University of Cambridge
 University of Oxford
 University of Amsterdam
 Université catholique de Louvain
 University of Liège
 Université de Montréal
 American University of Paris
 University of Granada
 University of Santiago de Compostela
 John Paul II Catholic University of Lublin
 Harvard University

Selected bibliography
  A History of French Civilization (with Robert Mandrou) (New York: Random House) 1964
  The Making of the Christian West: 980–1140; The Europe of the Cathedrals: 1140–1280; Foundations of a New Humanism: 1280–1440 (Geneva: Skira) 1966–67
  Rural Economy and Country Life in the Medieval West ((Columbia: University of South Carolina Press) 1968
  The Early Growth of the European Economy: Warriors and Peasants from the Seventh to the Twelfth Century (Ithaca: Cornell) University Press) 1974 
  La Société aux XIe et XIIe siècles dans la région mâconnaise (portions translated in The Chivalrous Society (1978; repr. 1981))
 Le Dimanche de Bouvines (1973) (Translated in English as The Legend of Bouvines (1990) )
 The Year 1000 (1974).
 The Age of the Cathedrals: Art and Society 980–1420 (1976).
 The Three Orders: Feudal Society Imagined (Chicago: University of Chicago Press) 1981.
 Dialogues, with Guy Lardreau, Paris, Flammarion, 1981, repr. Les petits Platons, 2013. 
 The Knight, The Lady, and the Priest: The Making of Modern Marriage in Medieval France (New York: Pantheon) 1981.
 Guillaume le Maréchal (Paris: Fayard), 1983, tr. as William Marshal: The Flower of Chivalry (1984).
 L'histoire continue (1991)

References

External links
 George Duby profile; accessed 19 June 2015. 
 Catalogue des ouvrages: « Fonds Georges DUBY » - Duby's personal research library
 "Pour une révision du « mâle » Moyen Âge de Georges Duby (États-Unis)", books.google.com; accessed 19 June 2015. 

1919 births
1996 deaths
Writers from Paris
Members of the Académie Française
Members of the Académie des Inscriptions et Belles-Lettres
Historians of France
University of Lyon alumni
University of Paris alumni
French medievalists
Academic staff of the Collège de France
Academic staff of the University of Provence
20th-century French historians
French male non-fiction writers
Grand Officers of the Ordre national du Mérite
Commandeurs of the Légion d'honneur
Commandeurs of the Ordre des Arts et des Lettres
Commandeurs of the Ordre des Palmes Académiques
Members of the Académie royale de langue et de littérature françaises de Belgique
Corresponding Fellows of the Medieval Academy of America
20th-century French male writers
Corresponding Fellows of the British Academy
Microhistorians